Star Wars: The Old Republic: Fatal Alliance is a science fiction novel from the Star Wars franchise written by Australian author Sean Williams. It is a prequel to and the first novel based on the MMORPG Star Wars: The Old Republic by BioWare Corp., and was released on July 20, 2010. The novel was first announced on November 10, 2008, by Sue Rostoni, the executive editor at Lucas Licensing, on the Starwars.com message boards.

This is the fifth of six Star Wars novels by Sean Williams, who also wrote the Force Heretic trilogy from the New Jedi Order series and the novelization of the 2008 video game Star Wars: The Force Unleashed and its sequel.

Publisher's summary
Tassaa Bareesh, a matriarch in the Hutt crime cartel, is holding an auction that's drawing attention from across the galaxy. Representatives of both the Republic and the Sith Empire are present, along with a Jedi Padawan sent to investigate, a disenfranchised trooper drummed out of the Republic's elite Blackstar Squad, and a mysterious Mandalorian with a private agenda. But the Republic's envoy is not what he seems, the Empire's delegate is a ruthless Sith apprentice, the Jedi Padawan is determined to do the right thing and terrified that he can’t, the trooper hopes to redeem her reputation, and the Mandalorian is somehow managing to keep one step ahead of everyone.

None of these guests — invited or uninvited — have any intention of participating in the auction. Instead they plan to steal the prize, which is locked inside an impregnable vault: two burned chunks of an exploded star cruiser, one of which may hold the key to the wealth of an entire world.

But the truth about the treasure is dangerous and deadly. And in the end, Sith and Jedi, Republic and Empire, must do something they’ve never done before, something that all the agents of good and evil could never make them do: join together to stop a powerful threat that could destroy the galaxy.

Characters
 Darth Chratis - A human male Sith Lord and master of Eldon Ax. He is depicted on the cover art of the novel.
 Eldon Ax - A human female Sith apprentice to Darth Chratis. Described as being small in stature and weight and having long, red dreadlocks.
 Dao Stryver - A Gektl (sentient species of bipedal reptilians) female Mandalorian warrior. She is listed as a male in the Dramatis Personae section of the book, but is later revealed to be a female at the end of the novel.
 Jet Nebula - A human male smuggler and captain of his ship, the Auriga Fire.
 Larin Moxla - A Kiffar female Republic trooper.
 Satele Shan - A human female and Grand Master of the Jedi Order. She also appears in the video game Star Wars: The Old Republic and is a direct descendant of Bastila Shan and Revan, central characters from the previous BioWare game Star Wars: Knights of the Old Republic.
 Shigar Konshi - A Kiffar male Jedi Padawan and apprentice of Satele Shan.
 Ula Vii - An Epicanthix male Imperial agent.

Release and reception
The Old Republic: Fatal Alliance was released on July 20, 2010, in a hardcover edition. It debuted at #1 on the New York Times bestseller list.

TheForce.net awarded the book a 3 out of 4, stating that the novel ties in well with the upcoming video game, but criticized the slow pacing and stated that fans not familiar with the story behind the game may find themselves lost.

References

External links
 Sample Chapter at Star Wars: The Old Republic website
 

2010 Australian novels
2010 science fiction novels
Australian science fiction novels
Star Wars: Knights of the Old Republic novels
Star Wars Legends novels
Del Rey books